The 2007–08 Ukrainian Second League is the 17th season of 3rd level professional football in Ukraine. The competitions are divided into two groups – A and B.

Team changes

Newly admitted 
The following teams were promoted from the 2007 Ukrainian Football Amateur League:
 FC Podillya-Khmelnytskyi – (returning after an absence of four seasons)
 FC Arsenal Bila Tserkva – (debut)
 FC Olimpik Kirovohrad – (debut)

More teams were admitted that participated in the 2006 Ukrainian Football Amateur League:
 FC Shakhtar Sverdlovsk – (returning after an absence of 12 seasons)
 FC Nyva-Svitanok Vinnytsia – (returning after a season of absence, previously as FC Nyva Vinnytsia)

Also, four more clubs were admitted to professional competitions without playing in amateur league
 FC Korosten – (debut)
 FC Komunalnyk Luhansk – (debut)
 FC Poltava – (debut)
 FC Tytan Donetsk – (debut)

Relegated from the First League 
 none (FC Krasyliv and FC Spartak Ivano-Frankivsk withdrew right before the start)

Group A

Location map

Standings

Top goalscorers

Group B

Location map

Standings

Top goalscorers

Results 
Matches with Hazovyk shown in gray count as a win for the opposing team.

Stadia 

Notes:
 CMS stands for Central Municipal Stadium, the name of each stadium that doesn't carry any official names, and is followed by the city's name where the stadium is located. Usually such stadiums are the property of the city with a generic name "Tsentralnyi" (Central, in Ukrainian).
 OOM stands for Oleh Oleksenko Memorial

See also 
 2007–08 Ukrainian First League

References 

Ukrainian Second League seasons
3
Ukra